Weda is a genus of turtle bugs in the family Pentatomidae. There are at least three described species in Weda.

Species
 Weda parvula (Van Duzee, 1904)
 Weda stylata Barber and Sailer, 1953
 Weda tumidifrons Barber and Sailer, 1953

References

Further reading

 
 
 
 
 
 
 
 
 

Pentatomidae genera
Podopinae